Cham-e Araban Do (also Romanized as Cham-e ʿArabān Do; also known as Cham-e ʿArabān) is a village in Aghili-ye Jonubi Rural District, Aghili District, Gotvand County, Khuzestan Province, Iran. At the 2006 census, its population was 360, in 71 families.

References 

Populated places in Gotvand County